A vila, or víla  (plural: vile, or víly ; , , , ,) is a Slavic fairy similar to a nymph, female, beautiful and with long blonde hair.

The vila is mostly known among South Slavs, however, some variants are present in the mythology of West Slavs as well. Among Czechs, víla denotes a woodland spirit (15th century), and ancient place names such as Vilice near Tábor, Vilov near Domažlice, and Vilín near Sedlčany seem to indicate that she was known there as well. In the Chronicle of Dalimil (3, 53) vila is "fool" (as in Old Polish). In Russia, vile are mentioned in the 11th century, but there is doubt that they were truly a part of Russian folklore, and not just a literary tradition. There are common traits between the vile and the rusalki, and Schneeweis holds that they are identical.

Etymology
The etymology is unclear. Possible explanations are from the verb viti "to wind" and  "whirlwind"; or from  "air", ultimately from Proto-Indo-European u̯ēi̯o- "wind".

Folkloric accounts
According to Natalie Kononenko, the vilas are female spirits of nature, of an ambivalent relationship with humans. In fairy tales, they may act with malice towards them (killing people, destroying crops), but may also help the hero by giving him magical objects and mounts. They may also show warrior-like qualities.

Among South Slavs, vile are portrayed as beautiful women with long blonde hair. There are three kinds, those living on land and in forests, water nymphs, and cloud or air nymphs. They appear as swans, falcons, horses, or wolves; cloud nymphs appear as a whirlwind. At night, they roam the clouds emitting a terrible noise of pipes and drums. Anyone who calls them becomes stiff and moves only with difficulty. He is stricken by disease and dies within a year or two.

Vile like to ride horses or stags, they go hunting, dance in a circle dance (Bulgarian: samodivski igriška) and seek the love of handsome strong men, assisting them against their enemies. Their fondness for fighting is reminiscent of the teutonic Valkyrie and is unique in Slavic mythology. They possess supernatural powers and are able in the art of healing. They build splendid castles at the edges of clouds. They confuse men's spirits with their arrows. They steal children and substitute them with changelings. In Slovakia, vile are the restless souls of deceased girls who lure young men into a deadly circle dance.

In Serbian epic poetry, every hero has a vila as an elective or blood sister. Girls can also have vile as blood sisters, and may ask them to improve one's beauty or to protect a distant lover.

Vile are usually friendly to people, but they can take horrible revenge on those who insult them, disregard their orders, or uninvitedly approach their circle dance. Their general amiability distinguishes them from the rusalki. The folk venerated them by placing flowers, food and drink before caves where they were believed to have lived.

Within the Czech tradition, víly are almost always malicious, unless respected and avoided. They are portrayed as beautiful women with long flowing hair, who primarily live in the woods, marches, or in forest clearings. They are said to try to entrance men, who wander into their land, by their looks and beautiful voices. Víly are also said to live in groups, and are keen to dancing in circles, which was also another way of trapping people, as it was believed that if you were to start dancing with them, then you would never return home.

Legacy
According to ethnologist Éva Pócs, the word vila also appears in the Serbian and Croatian words  vilovnjak, vilenjak, vilenica, vilaš - all referring to a type of "fairy magician", people who, as per historical and folkloric records, were given powers by the vilas ("fairies").

Western European references

Dictionaries
Meyer's Konversationslexikon defines Wiles or Wilis as female vampires, the spirits of betrothed girls who die before their wedding night. According to Heine, wilis are unable to rest in their graves because they could not satisfy their passion for dancing naked, especially in town squares. They also gather on the highway at midnight to lure young men and dance them to their death. In Serbia, they were maidens cursed by God; in Bulgaria, they were known as samodiva, girls who died before they were baptized; and in Poland, they are beautiful young girls floating in the air atoning for frivolous past lives. In some tales, the reason for abandoning their loves is tragic; the Vila are cursed never to find their true love, and if they do, that love will die a terrible death.

Loosely anglicised as "the willies", these ghostly Vilis gave rise to the idiom, "to give someone the willies", i.e., "to create a feeling of nervousness, fear, or creepiness in someone".

Literature
This legend inspired Victor Hugo to include "les wilis" in his poem "Fantômes" in Les Orientales (1828).

Heinrich Heine in his 1835 De l'Allemagne vividly describes "die Wilis" as a Slavic legend.

In J.K. Rowling's Harry Potter series, veela are magical beings who resemble stunningly beautiful women. They can put men into trance with their singing and dancing, and when angered, they transform into horrific, bird-like creatures and can launch fireballs from their hands. Veela appear in the fourth book of the series, Harry Potter and the Goblet of Fire, where they serve as mascots to the Bulgarian Quidditch team during the Quidditch World Cup. The character Fleur Delacour is also a quarter-veela.

In Heather Walter's Malice duology, the vila serve as a darker counterpart to other fae, based more closely on the Irish interpretations.

Theatre and opera

The wilis appear in Adolphe Adam's Romantic ballet Giselle, first danced in Paris in 1841, as the ghosts of young girls who were betrayed by their lovers and who died before their wedding days. They dance in the forests on moonlit nights, punishing young men by dancing them to death, but must disappear at the break of dawn. These Wilis snatch away the villainous Hilarion's life-breath, and almost do the same for the hero, Albrecht, but he is saved by the love of the ghostly Giselle.

The first opera completed by Giacomo Puccini, Le Villi, makes free use of the same thematic material. It had its debut in May 1884 at the Teatro Dal Verme, Milan, and was revised for a more successful reception at the Royal Theater, Turin, that December.

In "The Vilia Song", from the 1905 operetta The Merry Widow by Franz Lehár, Viktor Léon and Leo Stein (and translated by Adrian Ross), a hunter pines for Vilia, "the witch of the wood", a fairy being who causes him to fall in love with her and then vanishes.

References

Further reading
 
 

Bulgarian folklore
Czech folklore
Croatian folklore
Serbian folklore
Nav'
Nature spirits
Forest spirits
Female legendary creatures
Fairies